Griffin's Hill Pass, also known as just Griffin's Hill is situated in the KwaZulu-Natal province of South Africa, on the Regional road R103 between Mooi River and Estcourt.

References

Mountain passes of KwaZulu-Natal